Copperville, Maryland may refer to the following places in Maryland:
Copperville, Carroll County, Maryland
Copperville, Talbot County, Maryland